Musa Büyük (born May 22, 1980) is a Turkish retired footballer. He played as a winger.

He played for Zeytinburnuspor (1996–2003), İstanbulspor (2003–2004), Ankaraspor (2005–2006), Trabzonspor (2006–2008) and Kocaelispor (2008–2009). He was capped three times for the Turkey B.

References

1980 births
Living people
Turkish footballers
Turkey B international footballers
Zeytinburnuspor footballers
Ankaraspor footballers
İstanbulspor footballers
Trabzonspor footballers
Kocaelispor footballers
Diyarbakırspor footballers
Samsunspor footballers
Süper Lig players
Association football midfielders